The 1988 Big Ten Conference baseball tournament was held at Ray Fisher Stadium on the campus of the University of Michigan in Ann Arbor, Michigan, from May 19 through 21. The top four teams from the regular season participated in the double-elimination tournament, the eighth annual tournament sponsored by the Big Ten Conference to determine the league champion.  won their third tournament championship and earned the Big Ten Conference's automatic bid to the 1988 NCAA Division I baseball tournament.

Format and seeding 
The 1988 tournament was a 4-team double-elimination tournament, with seeds determined by conference regular season winning percentage only.

Tournament

All-Tournament Team 
The following players were named to the All-Tournament Team.

Most Outstanding Player 
Vince Palyan was named Most Outstanding Player. Palyan was an outfielder for Minnesota.

References 

Tournament
Big Ten baseball tournament
Big Ten Baseball Tournament
Big Ten baseball tournament